John of Austria may refer to:

People
 John of Austria (1547–1578), Spanish military leader, illegitimate son of Charles V, Holy Roman Emperor
 John Joseph of Austria (1629–1679), Spanish general and political figure, illegitimate son of Philip IV of Spain
 Archduke John of Austria (1782–1859), thirteenth child of Leopold II, Holy Roman Emperor
 Vimaladharmasuriya I of Kandy (reigned 1592–1604), baptized by the Portuguese as Don João da Austria

Other
 Don John of Austria (opera), by Isaac Nathan (1791–1864)
 John of Austria (Messina), a monument in Messina, Sicily